Štefan Hadalin (born 6 June 1995) is a Slovenian World Cup alpine ski racer.

World Cup results

Season standings

Results per discipline

Race podiums

 1 podium – (1 Combined)

World Championship results

Olympic results

References

External links

Living people
1995 births
Slovenian male alpine skiers
Alpine skiers at the 2018 Winter Olympics
Olympic alpine skiers of Slovenia
Alpine skiers at the 2012 Winter Youth Olympics